Rafael Marques de Morais (born 1971) is an Angolan journalist and anti-corruption activist who received several international awards for his reporting on conflict diamonds and government corruption in Angola. He currently heads the anti-corruption watchdog Maka Angola.

Early life
While growing up, Marques became disturbed by the worsening state of his country: “I had never heard of a lawyer, [had] no idea of what human rights were, no idea of what fighting corruption was”, he later recalled. “I realised that the way of addressing the issues that concerned me was by being a journalist.”

He received a BA (Hons) Anthropology & Media from Goldsmiths, University of London and an MSc in African Studies from St Antony's College, University of Oxford. He started work as a journalist in 1992 at the state-owned newspaper Jornal de Angola.

Shortly after joining Jornal de Angola, Marques wrote an article on the forthcoming presidential election in which he quoted an opposition leader's criticism of dos Santos. He did not intend for the quotation to be published in the newspaper, but through some editorial error it did appear in the paper. Marques was punished with a transfer to the local news desk. Owing to his continued “tendency to inject unwelcome social commentary into even the driest reportage”, he continued to be demoted. One day, assigned to write about the latest national statistics, he included  political analysis. “And that was the last straw”, he later told a reporter. He was fired.

In 1998 the Angolan Civil War resumed. In 1999 shortly after publishing the opinion piece “Cannon Fodder” Marques began collecting signatures on a petition calling for an end to the war. He was attacked on radio and in the press.

"The Lipstick of Dictatorship"
On 3 July 1999, the weekly magazine Agora published an article by Marques entitled "The Lipstick of Dictatorship" (a play on words based on the Portuguese term for a police baton). In it, he criticized Angolan President José Eduardo dos Santos. Marques called Dos Santos a dictator and charged him with destroying Angola and with promoting “incompetence, embezzlement and corruption as political and social values". Three months later, on 16 October, Marques was arrested at his home in Luanda and charged with defamation.

He was held for forty days without charges and was not permitted to contact his family or a lawyer. At night “the police would burst in, wake him up, and try to force him to sign blank documents that could later be doctored against him.” When he refused, they denied him food and water. Marques went on a hunger strike that went public. As a result he was transferred to another prison, where he was given food, but where his cell was so crowded that “the prisoners slept leaning up against the walls which were crawling with lice.”

Thanks to rising international pressure on Angola spurred by the efforts of the Open Society Institute, Marques was released on bail on 25 November, on the condition that he remain in Luanda and not speak to journalists or make public statements. On 15 December, without explanation, the Luanda Provincial Court transferred his case to the Supreme Court of Angola.

According to the Committee to Protect Journalists, dos Santos's government thereupon “began a campaign of verbal abuse against Marques,” citing a statement by legislator Mendes de Carvalho, during a 19 January 2000 parliamentary debate on press freedom, that if Marques kept criticizing dos Santos, he “would not live to the age of 40.”

Trial

His trial began on 9 March 2000. He was charged under Angola's Law 7/78, also known as the Law on Crimes Against State Security. The Committee to Protect Journalists charged that “Law 7/78 violates Article 35 of the 1992 Angolan Constitution, which guarantees the right to freedom of expression.”

Although it had been scheduled to be heard before the Supreme Court, Marques' case was referred back to the Criminal Divisional Court, where it was heard before Joaquim de Abreu Cangato, a former member of Angola's secret police with no legal training. On 10 March the trial was adjourned until 21 March. On that date, Cangato ordered spectators, including US and Portuguese embassy officials, human-rights activists, and journalists, to leave the courtroom, after which the trial continued in secrecy.

On 31 March, Marques was found guilty of the charge of abuse of the press, resulting in an “injury” to the President. He was sentenced to six months' imprisonment, but remained free pending an appeal. He was also fined US$17,000.

The US State Department expressed concern that Marques had not received a fair trial. The US-based Committee to Protect Journalists "strongly condemned" the prosecution. On 27 October, under international pressure, the Supreme Court changed Marques's sentence to a suspended sentence on the condition that he not write anything defamatory about the government for the following five years. He was also ordered to pay damages to the President, and his passport was confiscated until the end of February 2001.

Later work 
Following the defamation incident, Marques focused on ending the Angolan Civil War, organizing a coalition of 250 civic and religious leaders to call for peaceful resolution. On 14 July 2001, he was detained again after visiting evicted people in a resettlement camp outside of Luanda with BBC reporter Justin Pearce; the people in the camp had been forcibly evicted from a neighborhood in the city that had apparently been rezoned for commercial development.

Between 1999 and 2002, Marques wrote a series of articles about the trade in conflict diamonds in Luanda Province and corruption in Cabinda Province, a major oil center. According to his Civil Courage Prize citation, "his unvarnished criticisms of the Angolan army's brutality and the malfeasance of the government and foreign oil interests put him at extreme personal risk."

In 2003 he wrote Cabinda: A Year of Pain, a catalog of hundreds of human rights abuses allegedly inflicted on the populace by government forces and others. In several human rights reports, and in the September 2011 book Blood Diamonds: Corruption and Torture in Angola, he described the killing and terrorizing of villagers by private security companies and Angolan military officials in the name of protecting mining operations. In November 2011 he issued a criminal complaint accusing nine Angolan generals of crimes against humanity in connection with diamond mining.

In 2008, he founded an anti-corruption website called Maka Angola.

Other professional activities
Marques has participated in a number of international conferences and seminars, including "Transitions: A Conversation with National Leaders," sponsored by New York University and the International Peace Academy and held in New York in March 2005; "Beyond 'Conflict Diamonds:' a New Report on Human Rights and Angolan Diamonds," held at the Woodrow Wilson Center for International Scholars in Washington, DC, on 24 March 2005; and "Angola's Oil Curse," at the Post-Nobel Conference on "Oil Revenues – From Curse to Blessing for Developing Countries?”, held on 17 December 2004.

Recognition 
Marques received the Percy Qoboza Award of the US National Association of Black Journalists in 2000. In 2006, he received the Civil Courage Prize from the Northcote Parkinson Fund, which recognizes "steadfast resistance to evil at great personal risk — rather than military valor". In 2015 Marques received the Index on Censorship Freedom of Expression Award. 

On October 1, 2015, Rafael Marques de Morais was declared a recipient of the 2015 Allard Prize for International Integrity, sharing the CDN$100,000 prize with co-recipient John Githongo. Commenting at the time of his nomination, Marques said “It is a boost for my work, and an important break in my isolation and regular harassment. It also provides a ray of hope for Angolans who believe in the importance of exposing corruption as a criminal offense and the main scourge of society.”

Marches shared the 2014 Gerald Loeb Award for International business journalism for "The Shortest Route to Riches."

In May 2018, the International Press Institute awarded Marques the World Press Freedom Hero prize, commending him for his "dedication to pursuing truth at all costs".

References

External links
Maka Angola official site

 Why Is Angola Putting Journalist Rafael Marques On Trial For Exposing Human Rights Abuses?, Forbes, 12 November 2014

Angolan newspaper journalists
Angolan political activists
Anti-corruption activists
1971 births
Living people
20th-century Angolan people
21st-century Angolan people
Gerald Loeb Award winners International